The 1975 Long Beach State 49ers football team represented California State University, Long Beach during the 1975 NCAA Division I football season.

Cal State Long Beach competed in the Pacific Coast Athletic Association. The team was led by second year head coach Wayne Howard, and played their home games at Veterans Stadium adjacent to the campus of Long Beach City College in Long Beach, California. They finished the season with a record of nine wins, two losses (9–2, 4–1 PCAA).

Schedule

Team players in the NFL
The following were selected in the 1976 NFL Draft.

Notes

References

Long Beach State
Long Beach State 49ers football seasons
Long Beach State 49ers football